3 Molinos Resort was a short-lived professional continental cycling team based in Spain and participated in the UCI Europe Tour When selected the team got a wildcard to UCI ProTour events.  '3 Molinos' was founded in 2006 as a professional continental team, but this proved to be their last as funding was withdrawn due to doping scandals. The team was managed by José Francisco Perez, with José Luis Fernandez assisting.

3 Molinos Resort also sponsored a basketball team in the municipality of Murcia, in San José de la Vega, during the 2006-2007 season, in which he was regional champion of the 1st Male Autonomous Division.

2006 squad

Major wins
Source:
2006
 Overall Vuelta a Murcia, Santos González
 Overall Clásica Internacional de Alcobendas, Jan Hruška
Stage 3, Jan Hruška
 Stage 4 Volta ao Alentejo em Bicicleta, Alberto Benito
 Stage 4 Vuelta Asturias, Mikel Artetxe
  National Time trial championship, Toni Tauler

References

Molinos
Cycling teams established in 2006
Cycling teams disestablished in 2006
2006 disestablishments in Spain